Kushk-e Mohammadabad (also Romanized as Kūshk-e Moḩammadābād; also known as Kūshk-e Ḩājjī Gholūm) is a village in Banesh Rural District, Beyza District, Sepidan County, Fars Province, Iran. At the 2006 census, its population was 292, in 73 families.

References 

Populated places in Beyza County